An air hostess is a female flight attendant.

Air Hostess may also refer to:
"Air Hostess" (song), a 2004 song by Busted
Air Hostess (TV series), a 1986 Hindi TV series
Air Hostess (1933 film), a film written by Keene Thompson
 Air Hostess (1949 film) a 1949 film
Air Hostess (1959 film), or Kong zhong xiao jie, a  Hong Kong film of 1959